Paul Bromme (24 December 1906 – 2 February 1975) was a German politician of the Social Democratic Party (SPD) and former member of the German Bundestag.

Life 
In the first legislative period (1949–1953) of the German Bundestag, Bromme was a member of the SPD for the Lübeck constituency. From 1954 to 1971 he was an SPD member of the state parliament of Schleswig-Holstein.

Literature

References

1906 births
1975 deaths
Members of the Bundestag for Schleswig-Holstein
Members of the Bundestag 1949–1953
Members of the Bundestag for the Social Democratic Party of Germany
Members of the Landtag of Schleswig-Holstein